Langwith Colliery railway station served the miners of the colliery in Whaley Thorns, Derbyshire, England, from 1894 to 1945 on the Mansfield to Worksop line.

History 
The station was opened on 4 November 1894 by the Midland Railway. It didn't appear in the timetable. It closed after 1945.

References 

Disused railway stations in Derbyshire
Former Midland Railway stations
Railway stations in Great Britain opened in 1894
Railway stations in Great Britain closed in 1945
1894 establishments in England
1945 disestablishments in England